Srsen may refer to:

 Sršeň, Czech surname
 Sršen, Croatian surname